The X Conference of Heads of State and Government of the CPLP, commonly known as the 10th CPLP Summit (X Cimeira da CPLP) was the 10th biennial meeting of heads of state and heads of government of the Community of Portuguese Language Countries, held in Díli, Timor Leste, on 23 July 2014.

Outcome
The theme of the 10th CPLP Summit was "CPLP and Globalization", centered on the importance of strengthening the Lusophone World and its influence internationally.

Executive Secretary
Mozambican diplomat Murade Isaac Murargy was reelected as the Executive Secretary of the Community of Portuguese Language Countries.

References

External links
CPLP Summits official site

CPLP Summits
Dili
Foreign relations of East Timor